HaatChhani (Beckon: Becon) is a Bengali thriller film directed and written by Gourishankar Sarkhel. The film was produced by Mihir Kanti Biswas under Labu Film International

References 

2012 films
2012 thriller films
Bengali-language Indian films
2010s Bengali-language films
Indian thriller films